Fu Jen School is a Catholic philosophical school in Taiwan. It advocates the spiritual core of Fu Jen Catholic University’s motto, and establishes a combination of Scholasticism, Neo-scholasticism, Transcendental Thomism, and Traditional Chinese philosophy, that called the "Chinese Neo Scholastic Philosophy".

Former Fu Jen School
The original Fu Jen School refers to the historical and philosophical school developed during the Beijing period (1925~1951) of Fu Jen Catholic University. The initial purpose was to resist the New Culture Movement and anti-traditional Chinese ethics advocated by Peking University. The main scholars are represented by Chen Yuan, Yu Jiaxi (zh), Chou Tsu-mo (zh), Qigong and others.

Fu Jen School of Philosophy
Since 1961, Paul Yu Pin formulated a new university motto "Truth, Goodness, Beauty, Sanctity" and started the earliest graduate institute of philosophy in Taiwan, making the Fu Jen Philosophy Department the only center of Scholasticism in Taiwan. He developed a set of philosophical theories centered on "Three Kinds of Knowing"  and gradually became a school in the sixty years after WWII.

In the history of the development of Christian philosophy, the philosophical connotations of different civilizations have been integrated repeatedly, including Greek philosophy, Arabic Islamic culture, and cultures of different nations after the thirteenth and fourteenth centuries. During the Ming Dynasty, Jesuit priests such as Mateo Ricci (1553-1610) introduced Catholicism and its philosophy to China, and began to promote the integration of Christian philosophy and Chinese civilization. On the basis of these centuries of development, the contemporary "Chinese Neo Scholastic Philosophy" group of scholars based on Fu Jen Catholic University has become the "Fu Jen School".

Members
Bernard Li
Gabriel Chen-Ying Ly
Chien-ming Chu (zh)
Hsiao Chih Sun (zh)

and others.

Journals
Universitas: Monthly Review of Philosophy and CultureA&HCI
Fu Jen Religious Studies

See also

Kyoto School

References

External links
Fu Jen School
Fu Jen Institute of Scholasticism Scholasticism Philosophy

Philosophical schools and traditions
Scholasticism
Philosophy of religion
Chinese philosophy
Fu Jen Catholic University